The Dorena Bridge is a covered bridge near Dorena in Lane County, Oregon in the United States. It is listed on the National Register of Historic Places. The  structure crosses the Row River near the upper end of Dorena Reservoir.

See also
 List of Oregon covered bridges
 List of bridges on the National Register of Historic Places in Oregon
 National Register of Historic Places listings in Lane County, Oregon

References

External links
 

1949 establishments in Oregon
Bridges completed in 1949
Covered bridges on the National Register of Historic Places in Oregon
Covered bridges in Lane County, Oregon
National Register of Historic Places in Lane County, Oregon
Road bridges on the National Register of Historic Places in Oregon
Wooden bridges in Oregon